Garfield is an unincorporated community and a census-designated place (CDP) located in and governed by Chaffee County, Colorado, United States. The population of the Garfield CDP was 15 at the United States Census 2010. The Salida post office (Zip Code 81201) serves the area.

Geography

Demographics

Attractions
Monarch Mountain ski and snowboard area
Monarch Pass
San Isabel National Forest

See also

Outline of Colorado
Index of Colorado-related articles
State of Colorado
Colorado cities and towns
Colorado census designated places
Colorado counties
Chaffee County, Colorado
San Isabel National Forest
Monarch Ski and Snowboard Area

References

External links

Garfield @ GhostTowns.com
Chaffee County website
Monarch Mountain website
San Isabel National Forest website

Census-designated places in Chaffee County, Colorado
Census-designated places in Colorado
1879 establishments in Colorado